Morulina is a genus of springtails in the family Neanuridae. There are about 11 described species in Morulina.

Species
These 11 species belong to the genus Morulina:
 Morulina alia Christiansen & Bellinger, 1980
 Morulina callowayia Wray, 1953
 Morulina ceylonica Dall
 Morulina crassa Christiansen & Bellinger, 1980
 Morulina gigantea (Tullberg, 1876)
 Morulina mackenziana Hammer, 1953
 Morulina multatuberculata (Coleman, 1941)
 Morulina nucifera
 Morulina nuda Cassagnau, 1955
 Morulina thulensis Hammer, 1953
 Morulina verrucosa (Borner, 1903)

References

Further reading

 

Neanuridae
Articles created by Qbugbot
Springtail genera